"He Hit Me (And It Felt Like a Kiss)" is a song written by Gerry Goffin and Carole King for girl group the Crystals under the guidance of Phil Spector in 1962. Goffin and King wrote the song after discovering that their babysitter and singer "Little Eva" Boyd was being regularly beaten by her boyfriend. When they inquired why she tolerated such treatment, Eva replied, with complete sincerity, that her boyfriend's actions were motivated by his love for her.

Production

Phil Spector's arrangement was ominous and ambiguous.

Release
Upon its initial release, "He Hit Me" received some airplay, but then there was a widespread protest of the song, with many concluding that the song was an endorsement of spousal abuse. Soon, the song was played only rarely on the radio, as now.

The 1930 Frank Borzage film Liliom contains the line "He hit me and it felt like a kiss" in its final scene. The film was not a success and nothing suggests that Goffin or King had seen it.  Liliom, originally a play by Hungarian playwright Ferenc Molnár, was the basis for the Rodgers and Hammerstein musical classic, Carousel.  While King and Goffin may not have seen Liliom, it is possible that they were familiar with the successful 1956 film version of Carousel, which contains essentially the same line. However, King has stated that Little Eva, their babysitter who inspired the song, had used that exact phrase to them.

Carole King, in that same radio interview, said that she was sorry she had ever had anything to do with the song. She was a survivor of repeated domestic abuse (but not from Goffin, who had been her husband from 1959 to 1969).

In popular culture

In the 1993 The Batman Adventures: Mad Love one-shot comic book by Paul Dini and Bruce Timm, the character Harley Quinn is asked by her therapist what it feels like to be in an abusive relationship with the Joker. Harley Quinn answers, "It felt like a kiss!"
In 2005, the English band Spiritualized recorded a song called "She Kissed Me (It Felt Like a Hit)".
The My Life with the Thrill Kill Kult song "Glamour Is a Rocky Road" quotes the song's title.
The song was played in its entirety on the September 26, 2007, episode of The Tom Leykis Show titled 'The One They Won't Play'. The subject of the show's hour was in relation to Phil Spector's writing and production of the song, and the fact that he got married in the period between being accused of the murders and the end of his trial.
Amy Winehouse frequently mentioned the song as one of her all-time favourite tracks and biggest influences.
In 2008, Glasvegas released a Christmas EP titled "A Snowflake Fell and It Felt Like a Kiss," the title track being an homage to The Crystals.
The Cardigans song "And Then You Kissed Me" rewrites and reinterprets "He Hit Me".
Amy Rigby's song "Dancing With Joey Ramone" lists "He Hit Me (and It Felt Like a Kiss)" as one of the songs they danced to in her dream.
Mad Men used the song as the closing credit bump on the April 8, 2012, episode titled "Mystery Date."
The Nation of Ulysses song "The Sound of Jazz to Come" reworks the song's title into "she hit me it felt like a kiss" after riffing on John Coltrane's "A Love Supreme."
Lana Del Rey uses the line "Hit me and it felt like a kiss" in her 2014 song "Ultraviolence" from the album of the same name. Prior to this, she used it in her unreleased song "Beautiful Player."
 The first season finale of Sex Education on Netflix in 2019, plays The Grizzly Bear cover in underscoring the unexpected make-out session between bully Adam and the out Eric.
Hozier credits the song as being very similar in sentiment to his song, "Cherry Wine".

Cover versions

1982 – The Motels, All Four One
1994 – Courtney Love's band, Hole, released a cover of the song as a b-side to their single "Softer, Softest".  In 1995 the band played a cover of the song as part of their MTV Unplugged performance. Love introduced the song by saying, "This is a really sick song. It's one of those Spector songs and it was written by Carole King, which… you have to think." At the end of the song, Love commented "Nice feminist anthem."
2007 – The Blackeyed Susans, Dedicated to the Ones We Love ("She Hit Me (and It Felt Like a Kiss)")
2007 – Grizzly Bear, during the headlining tour for their album Yellow House. They also recorded the song during a Daytrotter session in February 2007, to be made available online for download. A studio version of the song was released on the band's Friend EP while a live take was released as the B-side to "While You Wait for the Others" on the Live on KCRW 7".
2008 – Ruby and the Rednecks released a cover of the song live at CBGB's. 
2012 – Kramer, The Brill Building (Tzadik Records) singing this song in a gender-reversed rendition swaying wildly between the heart-felt and the satirical.
2013 – Anika, Anika EP
2013 – Nicole Dollanganger on the album Ode to Dawn Weiner: Embarrassing Love Songs.
2021 – Veronica Swift, This Bitter World (Mack Avenue Records)

References

1962 singles
Song recordings produced by Phil Spector
Philles Records singles
The Crystals songs
Songs written by Carole King
Songs with lyrics by Gerry Goffin
Songs about domestic violence
Songs about kissing
1962 songs
Songs based on actual events
Obscenity controversies in music